Adisaya Suriyabha  (14 February 1889 – 27 January 1963), was the Princess of Siam (later Thailand). She was a member of Siamese Royal Family. She was a daughter of Chulalongkorn, King Rama V of Siam.

Her Mother was Chao Chom Manda Aon Bunnag, daughter of Lord (Chao Phraya) Surabandh Bisudhi (niece of Si Suriyawongse). She was the younger sister of Princess Oraprabandh Rambai. She and her mother, and elder sister lived together firstly in the Grand Palace, then moved to the area of Dusit Palace, and lived there all of her life.

She died on 27 January 1963, at the age of 73.

Royal Decorations
   Dame of The Most Illustrious Order of the Royal House of Chakri: received 9 May 1950
  Dame Cross of the Most Illustrious Order of Chula Chom Klao (First class): received 2 May 1950

Ancestry

1889 births
1963 deaths
19th-century Thai women
19th-century Chakri dynasty
20th-century Thai women
20th-century Chakri dynasty
Thai female Phra Ong Chao
Order of Chula Chom Klao
Children of Chulalongkorn
Daughters of kings